Mac Walters is a video game developer best known for his work a BioWare as a writer on the Mass Effect series.

Career 

Walters joined BioWare in 2003 as a writer on Jade Empire. He followed this with a senior writer on the first Mass Effect game, before becoming lead writer on the second and third entry in the series. As the writing team worked on the story, Walters encouraged the team to focus more on characters, to get players invested in the events of the game. Around the time of the second Mass Effect game, Walters also wrote the story for a spin-off comic called Mass Effect: Redemption. In 2013, Walters was also nominated for a BAFTA award for his writing on Mass Effect 3.

He briefly served as narrative director on Anthem, before returning to the Mass Effect universe as creative director on Mass Effect: Andromeda. As they began work on Andromeda, Walters encouraged the team to return to a creative place where "anything is possible", rather than simply making Mass Effect 4. During this time, Walters also penned a novel to bridge the narrative events of the Mass Effect trilogy and Andromeda. The planned fourth novel was effectively canceled, as Walters' duties as creative director of Andromeda eventually took precedence, and development has stalled for the Mass Effect film. After the release of Andromeda, Walters became project director for Mass Effect: Legendary Edition.

Walters became the production director on Dragon Age: Dreadwolf. In 2023, Walters announced he was leaving BioWare after 19 years with the company.

References

External links 
Mac Walters at MobyGames

Year of birth missing (living people)
BioWare people
Living people
Canadian video game designers
21st-century Canadian male writers